Parrhasius was, in Greek mythology, the name of two individuals:

 Parrhasius or Parrhasus, an Arcadian prince as one of the 50 sons of the impious King Lycaon either by the naiad Cyllene, Nonacris or by unknown woman. In some accounts, his father was Zeus. Parrhasius was also called the father of Arcas who had the region named after him. He was a hero and founder of the Arcadian city of Parrhasia.
 Parrhasius, twin brother of Lycastus and son of Ares and Phylonome, daughter of Nyctimus and Arcadia. Their mother them into the river Erymanthus but they survived when a wolf suckled them and a shepherd, Gyliphus, reared them. Parrhasius succeeded later to the throne of Arcadia.

Notes

Reference 

 Dionysus of Halicarnassus, Roman Antiquities. English translation by Earnest Cary in the Loeb Classical Library, 7 volumes. Harvard University Press, 1937-1950. Online version at Bill Thayer's Web Site
Dionysius of Halicarnassus, Antiquitatum Romanarum quae supersunt, Vol I-IV. . Karl Jacoby. In Aedibus B.G. Teubneri. Leipzig. 1885. Greek text available at the Perseus Digital Library.
Grimal, Pierre, The Dictionary of Classical Mythology, Wiley-Blackwell, 1996. 
Lucius Mestrius Plutarchus, Moralia with an English Translation by Frank Cole Babbitt. Cambridge, MA. Harvard University Press. London. William Heinemann Ltd. 1936. Online version at the Perseus Digital Library. Greek text available from the same website.
Pausanias, Description of Greece with an English Translation by W.H.S. Jones, Litt.D., and H.A. Ormerod, M.A., in 4 Volumes. Cambridge, MA, Harvard University Press; London, William Heinemann Ltd. 1918. . Online version at the Perseus Digital Library
Pausanias, Graeciae Descriptio. 3 vols. Leipzig, Teubner. 1903.  Greek text available at the Perseus Digital Library.

Greek mythological heroes
Sons of Lycaon
Children of Zeus
Demigods in classical mythology
Mythological kings of Arcadia
Kings in Greek mythology
Arcadian characters in Greek mythology
Arcadian mythology
Parrhasia